Dwarf galaxias may refer to:
 Galaxias divergens, a New Zealand fish;
 Galaxiella pusilla, an Australian fish.